Lignol is a commune in the Morbihan department of Brittany in north-western France.

Population

Lignol's population peaked in 1911. Lignol's population has been divided by two since this date because of rural exodus..
Inhabitants of Lignol are called in French Lignolais.

Geography

Lignol lies in the valley of the river Scorff. Historically, it belongs to Vannetais.

Map

History

There is a church in this town that was built during the 14th century. Lignol also has two castles, they were the homes of the dukes that used to rule the place and were under the domination of the House of Rohan. 
Lignol was the main place of the French resistance against the German occupation in the Guémené-sur-Scorff area. Since the Nazis occupied Guémené-sur-Scorff, the Resistance used the nearby towns as bases. Langoëlan and Lignol were their main ones in the region.

Economy

Agriculture is the main source of resources of the town.

Politics

During the presidential 2007 elections, inhabitants voted for Nicolas Sarkozy. Its current mayor is a former farmworker.

Sport

Lignol has a soccer club in association with the neighbouring town of Kernaskleden.

Gallery

See also
Communes of the Morbihan department

References

External links

 Mayors of Morbihan Association 

Communes of Morbihan